Cynewulf may refer to:

Cynewulf (8th century), Anglo-Saxon poet
Cynewulf of Lindisfarne (died 783), Bishop of Lindisfarne from 740 to 780
Cynewulf of Wessex (died 786), King of Wessex from 757 to 786